The Gordon Riots of 1780 were several days of rioting in London motivated by anti-Catholic sentiment. They began with a large and orderly protest against the Papists Act 1778, which was intended to reduce official discrimination against British Catholics enacted by the Popery Act 1698. Lord George Gordon, head of the Protestant Association, argued that the law would enable Catholics to join the British Army and plot treason. The protest led to widespread rioting and looting, including attacks on Newgate Prison and the Bank of England and was the most destructive in the history of London.

Violence started later on 2 June 1780, with the looting and burning of Catholic chapels in foreign embassies. Local magistrates, afraid of drawing the mob's anger, did not invoke the Riot Act. There was no repression until the Government finally sent in the army, resulting in an estimated 300–700 deaths. The main violence lasted until 9 June 1780.

The riots occurred near the height of the American War of Independence, when Britain, with no major allies, was fighting American rebels, France, and Spain. Public opinion, especially in middle-class and elite circles, repudiated anti-Catholicism and lower-class violence, and rallied behind Lord North's government. Demands were made for a London police force. There appeared painted on the wall of Newgate prison a proclamation that the inmates had been freed by the authority of  "His Majesty, King Mob". The term "" afterwards denoted an unruly and fearsome proletariat.

Edmund Burke later recalled the riots as a dangerous foretaste of the 1789 French Revolution: Wild and savage insurrection quitted the woods, and prowled about our streets in the name of reform....  A sort of national convention ... nosed parliament in the very seat of its authority; sat with a sort of superintendence over it; and little less than dictated to it, not only laws, but the very form and essence of legislature itself.

Background

The stated intention of the Papists Act of 1778 was, as its preamble notes, to mitigate some of the official discrimination against Roman Catholics in Great Britain. It absolved Catholics from taking the religious oath when joining the British Armed Forces as well as granting a few and limited liberties. There were strong expedient reasons for this change. British military forces at the time were stretched very thinly in what had become a global American War of Independence, with conflicts ongoing with France, Spain, and the new United States. The recruitment of Catholic people would be a significant help to address this shortfall of manpower.

The 1698 anti-Catholic laws had largely been ignored for many years and were rarely enforced. Because of this, many leading Catholics were opposed to the repeal of these laws, fearing it would stir up anti-Catholic sentiment for little practical return. It was also pointed out that large numbers of Catholics, recruited in Ireland and the Scottish Highlands, were already serving in the military. In spite of this, the government decided to press ahead with the Bill, and had it introduced in Parliament by Sir George Savile.

Protestant Association
The Protestant Association of London had the support of leading Calvinist religious figures, including Rowland Hill, Erasmus Middleton, and John Rippon. Lord George Gordon became its President in 1779, in an effort to force the repeal of the Papists Act. An articulate propagandist, though eccentric, Gordon inflamed the mob with fears of Papism and a return to absolute monarchical rule. He implied that Catholics in the military would, given a chance, join forces with their co-religionists on the Continent and attack Britain. He enjoyed popularity in Scotland where he took part in a successful campaign to prevent the same legislation from being introduced into Scots law, although the Act continued in force in England and Wales and in Ireland. The success in obstructing the law in Scotland led Gordon to believe he could enjoy similar success in the rest of Britain and Ireland. Early in 1780 Gordon had several audiences with King George III but was unable to convince him of what he saw as the dangers of the act. George III initially humoured Gordon, but grew increasingly irritated with him and eventually refused any future audiences.

The political climate deteriorated rapidly. On 29 May 1780, Gordon called a meeting of the Protestant Association, and his followers subsequently marched on the House of Commons to deliver a petition demanding the repeal of the Act.

Other causes
After the first march to Parliament, further riots occurred involving groups whose grievances were nationalist, economic, or political, rather than religious. Aside from the issue of Catholic emancipation, it has also been suggested that the driving force of the riots was Britain's poor economic situation: the loss of trade during the war had led to falling wages, rising prices, and periodic unemployment. As Rudé noted, there was no general attack on the Catholic community, "the victims of the riots" being distinguished by the fact they were "on the whole, persons of substance". Voting in parliamentary elections was restricted by a property threshold, so most Londoners were unable to vote and many hoped for reforms to make Parliament more representative of the people. However, Paul Monod has argued that "no matter how much one would like to interpret the Gordon Riots ... as economically motivated, they remain fundamentally anti-Catholic in character".

Shortly after the riots had broken out, the Duke of Richmond suggested that they were directly attributable to the passing of the Quebec Act six years before, a view that was ridiculed by many of his colleagues. Another suggested cause was Britain's weakened international position, which had arisen from the country's isolation in Europe and the disappointing news coming from the ongoing war. Some rioters were against the continuation of the war, and many strongly supported American independence, while others were angry that Britain's war effort was being mishandled by Lord North. In many cases a mix of issues blended together and drove people to take part in the rioting.

Riots

March on Parliament
On 2 June 1780 a huge crowd, estimated at 40,000 to 60,000 strong, assembled and marched on the Houses of Parliament. Many carried flags and banners proclaiming "No Popery", and most wore blue cockades which had become the symbol of their movement. As they marched, their numbers swelled. They attempted to force their way into the House of Commons, but without success. Gordon, petition in hand, and wearing in his hat the blue cockade of the Protestant Association, entered the Commons and presented the petition. Outside, the situation quickly got out of hand and a riot erupted. Members of the House of Lords were attacked as they arrived, and a number of carriages were vandalised and destroyed.

Despite being aware of the possibility of trouble, the authorities had failed to take steps to prevent violence breaking out. The Prime Minister, Lord North, had forgotten to issue an order mobilising the small number of Constables in the area. Those that were present in the House of Commons were not strong enough to take on the angry mob. Eventually a detachment of soldiers was summoned, and they dispersed the crowd without violence. Inside the House of Commons, the petition was overwhelmingly dismissed by a vote of 192 to 6.

Embassies attacked
Once the mob around Parliament had dispersed, it seemed to the government that the worst of the disorder was over. However, the same night a crowd gathered and attacked the Roman Catholic Sardinian Embassy Chapel in Lincoln's Inn Fields. Bow Street Runners and soldiers were called out and made thirteen arrests, although most of the ringleaders had managed to escape. The same night the chapel of the Bavarian Embassy in Warwick Street, Soho, was destroyed and crowds caused random violence in streets known to house rich Catholics.

Moorfields

The area of Moorfields, one of the poorest parts of the city, was the home of many Irish immigrant workers and had a large area of open ground where crowds could assemble. Despite the appeal of a prominent Irish merchant, James Malo, to the Lord Mayor, Brackley Kennett, no additional protection was offered to the area. During 3 June a crowd had gathered in Moorfields, and by nightfall it began to go on the rampage. Malo's house was amongst the many to be sacked and burned.

Newgate Prison, where rioters arrested on 2 June were being held, was attacked and largely destroyed, as was The Clink. This allowed large numbers of prisoners to escape, many of whom were never recaptured. Severe destruction was inflicted on Catholic churches and homes and chapels on the grounds of several embassies, as well as on New Prison, Fleet Prison, and the house of the Lord Chief Justice, William Murray, 1st Earl of Mansfield. On 7 June, called "Black Wednesday" by Horace Walpole, the riot reached its climax. An attempt on the Bank of England was narrowly averted when a combination of the London Military Association and regular troops repulsed rioters, resulting in heavy casualties.

Army response

The army was called out on 7 June and given orders to fire upon groups of four or more who refused to disperse. About 285 people were shot dead, with another 200 wounded. Around 450 of the rioters were arrested. Of those arrested, about twenty or thirty were later tried and executed. Gordon was arrested and charged with high treason, but was found not guilty. Brackley Kennett, the Lord Mayor, was convicted of criminal negligence for not reading out the Riot Act and was given a £1,000 fine. The military units which dealt with the rioters included the Horse Guards, Foot Guards, Inns of Court Yeomanry, the Honourable Artillery Company, line infantry including the 2nd (Queen's Royal) Regiment, and militia from the City and neighbouring counties. The defence of the Bank of England was conducted by the 9th Regiment of Foot under the command of Thomas Twisleton, 13th Baron Saye and Sele.

Aftermath
The riots damaged the reputation of Britain across Europe, where many saw British constitutional monarchy as an inherently unstable form of government. This came at a time when Britain was searching for allies, particularly Catholic Austria, in the American War of Independence to challenge the strong coalition the French had built. Britain had also initiated secret negotiations with Catholic Spain to end Spanish support of the United States. After learning of the riots, the Spanish government pulled back from peace negotiations with Britain, concerned that the disorder would lead to a widespread collapse of the current British administration.

The riots highlighted the problems Britain faced by not deploying a professional police force, a notion which was opposed as foreign and absolutist. The day after the riots broke out, the Earl of Shelburne shocked many by proposing in parliament that Britain should consider forming a force modelled on the French police.

The riots destroyed the popularity of radical politician John Wilkes, who led citizen militiamen against the rioters. Many of his followers saw this as a betrayal; some of them may have been among the rioters. A pamphlet and a book of poems defending the role of Gordon were written and published by the polemicist and hymn-writer Maria De Fleury.

The events at the Bank of England started a tradition where a detachment of soldiers, usually from the Brigade of Guards, would march to the bank to perform security duties. Until 1963 the duty was performed by the Guards in Home Service Dress with bearskin, though tennis shoes were worn inside the bank. From that date until 31 March 1973 the detachment became more functional than ceremonial, doing their duties in service dress with automatic weapons.

In fiction and film

George Walker's anti-Jacobin novel The Vagabond (1799) anachronistically resituates the Gordon Riots amidst the political events of the 1790s. Its narrator unwittingly becomes a prominent figure in the riots, which Walker depicts as solely destructive and acquisitive.

Maria Edgeworth's 1817 novel Harrington contains a vivid evocation of the Gordon Riots, with two unsympathetic characters taken for Papists and finding refuge in the home of the rich Spanish Jew, the father of the young Jewish woman at the centre of the love story.

Charles Dickens' 1841 novel Barnaby Rudge depicts the Gordon Riots and features Lord George in a prominent role.

John Creasey's 1974 novel The Masters of Bow Street depicts the Gordon Riots and the recalcitrance of Lord North to the establishment of a police force.

In Bernard Cornwell's Sharpe novels (1981–2007), the protagonist Richard Sharpe's mother was killed during the riots while he was still a child.

Miranda Hearn's 2003 historical novel A Life Everlasting depicts the main protagonists caught up in the riots as innocent Londoners.

In the film The Great Rock'n'Roll Swindle, a scene set in 1780 refers to the Gordon Riots, showing the Sex Pistols hung in effigy.

BABYLONdon, a novel by English SF/Fantasy author John Whitbourn (2020), blends a detailed depiction of the Gordon Riots with supernatural plot elements and an apocalyptic denouement.

The Invisibles, a comic series by Grant Morrison features a principal character mostly known as King Mob.

Mentioned by Peter O'Toole's character to Aldo Ray in The Day They Robbed The Bank of England, referencing that he and his men had been guarding the titular bank in a certain fashion since "the Gordon Riots in 1780."

See also
 Anti-Catholicism in the United Kingdom
 Philadelphia Nativist Riots

References

Notes

Sources
 Babington, Anthony. Military intervention in Britain: from the Gordon riots to the Gibraltar Incident. Routledge, 1990.
 Black, Eugene Charlton. "The Tumultuous Petitioners: The Protestant Association in Scotland, 1778–1780." Review of Politics 25.2 (1963): 183–211.
 Boeker, Professor Uwe. "The Gordon Riots" – Essay in English Language (Dresden University of Technology – TU Dresden, Institute for English and American Studies)
 Burney, Susan. "Journal Letter, June 5–12, 1780",  published in The Journals and Letters of Susan Burney  ed. Philip Olleson, p. 168–181, Ashgate, 2012. 
 Green, Dominic, "The Making of a "Protestant Rabbin". The Cultural Transfers of Lord George Gordon, 1781–1793", in Grenzueberschreitende Religion. Vergleichs- und Kulturtransferstudien zur neuzeitlichen Geschichte, ed. by Thies Schulze, Goettingen: Vandenhoeck & Ruprecht 2013, pp. 165–184.
 Haydon, Colin. Anti-Catholicism in Eighteenth-Century England, C. 1714–80: A Political and Social Study (1993)
 Haydon, Colin. "Eighteenth-Century English Anti-Catholicism: Contexts, Continuity and Diminution." in John Wolffe, ed., Protestant-Catholic Conflict from the Reformation to the Twenty-first Century (Palgrave Macmillan UK, 2013), 46–70. Table of contents
 
 Jones, Brad A. "'In Favour of Popery': Patriotism, Protestantism, and the Gordon Riots in the Revolutionary British Atlantic." Journal of British Studies 52.1 (2013): 79–102.
 McDonagh, Patrick. "Barnaby Rudge, ‘idiocy’ and paternalism: Assisting the ‘poor idiot’." Disability & Society 21.5 (2006): 411–423. Dickens,  Barnaby Rudge describes the riots in detail.
 Article 'Gordon Riots' by John Hungerford Pollen from 1909, transcribed by Joseph P. Thomas in: The Catholic Encyclopedia / ed. by Charles George Herbermann. – New York: Robert Appleton Co., 1907–1914
  Rudé, George.   "The Gordon Riots" History Today (July 1955) 5#7 pp 429–437
  Rudé, George.   "The Gordon Riots: A Study of the Rioters and their Victims", in Transactions of the Royal Historical Society, 5th series, no. 6 (1956), 93–114.
  Rudé, George.   The Gordon Riots, in Paris and London in the Eighteenth Century (London: Fontana/Collins, 1974).
  Rudé, George. The Crowd in History Chapter 9, 'Church and King' Riots", (Serif, London, 2005).
 Rogers, Nicholas. Crowds, Culture and Politics in Georgian Britain (Oxford: Clarendon Press, 1998), ch. 5, 'The Gordon Riots', pp. 152–175.
 Nicholson, John. The Great Liberty Riot of 1780 (Published by Bozo , 1985)
 Simms, Brendan. Three Victories and a Defeat: The Rise and Fall of the First British Empire. Penguin Books, 2008.

External links
 Contemporary illustrations: burning of the Newgate Prison and proclamation of George III. of June 5, 1780 (Corporation of London)
 Barnaby Rudge A Tale of the Riots of 'Eighty, Charles Dickens, from Project Gutenberg

1780 in England
1780 riots
1780s in London
Battles and military actions in London
Riots in London
Massacres committed by Great Britain
History of Christianity in England
Religiously motivated violence in England
Religion and politics
Religious riots
Political violence in England
Anti-Catholicism in England
Sectarian violence
Anti-Catholic riots
Attacks on churches in Europe
Pogroms
1780 in Christianity
Newgate Prison